Johan Fredrik Thaulow (22 May 1840 – 24 April 1912) was a Norwegian physician and Army officer.

He was born in Christiania to chemistry professor Moritz Christian Julius Thaulow. He was a nephew of chemist Harald Thaulow, and a cousin of painter Frits Thaulow. From 1889 to 1909 he headed the medical service of the Norwegian Army, eventually with the title of lieutenant general. He chaired the Norwegian Red Cross from 1889 to 1905.

References

1840 births
1912 deaths
Norwegian military doctors
Norwegian Army generals
Presidents of the Norwegian Red Cross